"Sua Cara" is a song by American electronic dance music band Major Lazer from Know No Better (2017). The song features Brazilian singers Anitta and Pabllo Vittar. The song was recorded in February 2017, shortly after the Brazilian Carnival.

Background and development
Diplo of Major Lazer has always been one of the great supporters of Brazilian funk and Brazilian music. He had previously worked on songs by DJ Marlboro, and even signed the musical group Bonde do Rolê to his label Mad Decent, along with producing songs by Banda Uó and Pabllo Vittar. He says: "I always try to know what happens in Brazil, it's important for me."

While in Brazil for Lollapalooza, in 2016, with his group project Jack Ü with Skrillex, he met singer Anitta, and handed her a demo of what would later become the track. In February 2017, Diplo posted a reply on his Twitter, about a possible collaboration with the singer, simply stating "soon". Anitta announced the collaboration on Instagram Live. Anitta and Pabllo Vittar performed a photoshoot on May 21 for the single's cover.

Music videos
A lyric video for the song was released onto Major Lazer's official YouTube account on the day of the EP's release on June 1, 2017. In just one day, the song had already reached 20 million views. The song became the most played song off the album, ahead of its main single "Know No Better", with Camila Cabello, Travis Scott, and Quavo, which had 2.5 million plays. In a publication thanking the success of the song on their Facebook page, a user asked about the music video, and they replied saying "soon".

On the night of June 20, Anitta posted a picture on her Instagram on a plane, stating there was a "surprise coming". Soon after, it was announced that the music video for "Sua Cara" would be shot in Morocco, with production by Bruno Ilogti and Giovanni Bianco; Both worked with Anitta on her 2015 album Bang!. Anitta commented that the video was the "hardest", but would "be worth it". The singers wore costumes by Amir Slama and Yasmine Sterea. There were "tops and bras, plus some hot pants" on the skin color, "in shades of beige and white". The dancers were dressed in pink, to match with the color of the sand.

On July 18, it was confirmed that the video would be released on July 30, during the 'Combatchy' party, held in Rio de Janeiro by the two Brazilian singers. The video was firstly displayed in the event, and later released on the internet. Along with the announcement, Anitta posted on her Instagram profile a video where she appears dancing behind a snake. The making of was released the day before.

The music video was released on July 30 at 4:00 p.m. After just 1 hour, the music video already had more than 2.7 million views and in 2 hours, had already reached 5 million. In addition, the video was the fastest to reach 1 million likes – 5 hours and 38 minutes – on YouTube, breaking One Direction's "Drag Me Down"s record of 18 hours. The video beat over 25 million views within 24 hours on YouTube, the most since Adele's "Hello" and became the lusophone video with most views in one day on YouTube.

Days after the release of the official music video, a director's cut version leaked on the internet, with unseen scenes in which Diplo appears taking off the helmet in one of the quadricycles, and also different scenes of singers Anitta and Vittar dancing together.

Chart performance
In Brazil, "Sua Cara" debuted at number sixty on Brazil's Billboard Hot 100 Airplay, where it lasted five consecutive weeks, and peaked at number 49 in September, 2017. In addition, it peaked at number five on the Billboard Hot Pop & Popular component chart.

Live performances
Anitta and Pabllo Vittar performed the song live for the first time on the Brazilian TV show Música Boa Ao Vivo, which is hosted by Anitta for this season and broadcast by cable channel Multishow on July 18, 2017.

Pabllo performed the song alongside Fergie on Rock in Rio Brazil on September 16, 2017

Accolades

Credits and personnel
Songwriting – Thomas Pentz, Larissa Machado, Boaz vd Beatz, Phabullo Silva, Umberto Tavares, Arthur Marques, Jefferson Junior, Rashid Badloe, Giordano Ashruf, Rodrigo Antunes, Shareef Badloe
Production – Major Lazer, King Henry, Afro Bro's, Boaz vd Beatz
Vocal producing and recording – Anitta, Pabllo Vittar
Engineer – King Henry

Charts

Weekly charts

Year-end charts

Certifications

See also
List of most viewed online videos in the first 24 hours

References

2017 singles
2017 songs
Major Lazer songs
Anitta (singer) songs
Pabllo Vittar songs
Song recordings produced by Benny Blanco
Portuguese-language songs
Songs written by Diplo
Songs written by Anitta (singer)